James Bailey "Jim" Kaler (December 29, 1938 — November 26, 2022) was an American astronomer and science writer.

After elementary and high-school education in Albany, New York, Kaler earned his A.B. at the University of Michigan in 1960. He attended graduate school at the University of Michigan (1960–61), at Christian-Albrechts-Universität zu Kiel (Germany, 1961–62), and UCLA (1962–64), where he also obtained his Ph.D. in Astronomy 1964. His thesis advisor was Lawrence H. Aller.

Professional career 
Kaler started his professional career with appointments as a research and teaching assistant at the University of Michigan from 1958 to summer 1960. In 1961 he worked as an astronomer with the United States Naval Observatory. In 1964 he was appointed as an assistant professor of Astronomy by the University of Illinois, and promoted to associate professor in 1968 and to a full professor position in 1976 (all at University of Illinois). Since 1995 he is Campus Honors Faculty. In 2003 he retired to become professor emeritus at the University of Illinois.

Kaler published over 120 papers. Examples include work on
 the chemical composition of planetary nebulae including their electron densities, on
 emission lines of planetary and diffuse nebulae, on
 the development of shells in planetary nebulae, and on
 stellar evolution.

He has served as president of the board of directors of the Astronomical Society of the Pacific and of the Board of the Champaign Urbana Symphony Orchestra.

Honors and awards 
 He has held Fulbright and Guggenheim Fellowships, and has been awarded medals for his work from the University of Liège in Belgium and the University of Mexico.
 He gave the Armand Spitz Lecture to the Great Lakes Planetarium Association and the Margaret Noble Address to the Middle Atlantic Planetarium Society.
 In 2003 he received the 2003 Campus Award for Excellence in Public Engagement by the University of Illinois.
 In 2008 he received the American Astronomical Society's Education Prize.
 He was elected a Legacy Fellow of the American Astronomical Society in 2020.
 Asteroid 17851 Kaler, discovered by the Near-Earth Asteroid Tracking program in 1998, was named after him, honoring his outreach activities.

Works
Jim Kaler has written for a variety of magazines, and was a consultant for Time-Life Books. He has long appeared on Illinois television and radio. In addition to two textbooks and three audio courses, he published several books, including
 First Magnitude: A Book of the Bright Sky 
 Stars and their Spectra,
 The Ever-Changing Sky,
 Extreme Stars (American Association of Publishers Outstanding Professional and Scholarly Title in Physics and Astronomy for 2001),
 The Cambridge Encyclopedia of Stars,
 Stars and Cosmic Clouds,
 The Little Book of Stars,
 The Hundred Greatest Stars, and
 Heaven's Touch (selected Book of the Week by Times Higher Education in September 2009).

His science www-star database "STARS" has scored more than 4 million visitors since its release in 1988.

References

External links 
CV/Resumé University of Illinois
Biographical Sketch University of Illinois
Obituary in the Champaign (Illinois) News Gazette

1938 births
Living people
American astronomers
American science writers
University of Michigan alumni
Fellows of the American Astronomical Society